Juniperus lutchuensis or  (syn. Juniperus taxifolia var. lutchuensis (Koidz.) Satake) is a species of juniper native to the Ryūkyū Islands, Izu Islands, Izu Peninsula, and Bōsō Peninsula, Japan.

Taxonomy
Juniperus lutchuensis was first described by Gen'ichi Koidzumi in 1918, with Okinawa Island the type locality. In 1962,  treated it as a variety of Juniperus taxifolia. Some authors treat it as a synonym of Juniperus taxifolia from the Bonin Islands, while others treat it as a variety of it, Juniperus taxifolia var. lutchuensis. It is probably best considered a separate species as it has a distinct DNA profile clearly different from J. taxifolia.

Description
It is dioecious, with separate male and female plants.

The seed cones are berry-like, green ripening in 18 months to purple-brown; they are spherical, 8–9 mm diameter, and have three or six fused scales in one or two whorls of three; the three larger scales each bear a single seed. The seeds are dispersed when birds eat the cones, digesting the fleshy scales and passing the hard seeds in their droppings. The pollen cones are yellow, 5 mm long.

Distribution and habitat

Conservation
Much of its habitat has been lost due to coastal development and revetments, and it has also often been taken from the wild for use in gardens and bonsai. Its conservation status is uncertain, but it is rare and may become threatened. In the 2018 Okinawa Red Data Book, Juniperus taxifolia var. lutchuensis is assessed as Endangered.

References

lutchuensis
Endemic flora of Japan
Flora of the Ryukyu Islands
Trees of Japan
Dioecious plants
Taxa named by Gen-ichi Koidzumi
Plants described in 1918